The 1900 Vanderbilt Commodores football team represented Vanderbilt University during the 1900 Southern Intercollegiate Athletic Association football season. The Commodores were coached by James L. Crane, in his second year as head coach. The loss to Texas was the first intersectional contest at the State Fair of Texas.

Schedule

References

Vanderbilt
Vanderbilt Commodores football seasons
Vanderbilt Commodores football